José de Rico (full name José Manuel León Hierro born in Barcelona, Spain in 1982) is a Spanish DJ, producer and songwriter.

Biography 
He worked in the Spanish electronic and dance music station Loca FM for 5 years gaining media coverage and a big following. He started producing for his own with a distinctive unique style starting 2009. Affiliated with "Roster Music", he has collaborated with a number of artists in Spain and internationally and considered one of the major Spanish DJs and producers. He mixed more than 100 tracks since 2009 and taken part in many music festivals.

His fame and international recognition increased after collaboration with Dominican reggaeton, house, Latin and dance act Henry Mendez with two charting hits "Te fuiste", "Rayos de sol" and "Noche de estrellas", hits in Spain and eventually internationally. According to PROMUSICAE, "Rayos de sol" was the third biggest single in Spain in 2012. According to the same year-end chart, "Noche de estrellas" was the 43rd best selling single.

Discography

Singles

Featured in

Other productions
(Selective)
2008: "Come with Me" - Iñaki Santos & Jose de Rico (remix)
2009: "Maiara" - Dario Nuñez & Jose de Rico
2009: "La Colegiala" - Corleone Brazini, Jason Tregebov & Jose de Rico
2009: "Bulgaria" - Miklov (Victor Magan & Jose de Rico remix)
2009: "Ready" - Josepo feat Adri (Victor Magan & Jose de Rico remix)
2009: "Una Rosa" - Juan Magan (Victor Magan & Jose de Rico remix)
2009: "Scratch" - Rafa Peralta (Jose de Rico)
2010: "Bata Bata" - Jason Tregebov & Jose de Rico (remix)
2010: "It's Worth It" (Jose de Rico feat. Estela Martin)
2010: "Eligibo" - Dario Nuñez feat. Samantha (Jose de Rico remix)
2010: "Let's Dance" - Victor Magan & Jason Tregebov feat Estela Martin (Jose de Rio & Gio Lopez remix)
2010: "Bocachica" - Jose de Rico feat. Fernando Vidal
2010: "Wekelee" - Dario Nuñez & Jose AM feat. Henry Mendez (Jose de Rico From Stars remix)

References

External links
 
 Jose de Rico on Last.fm

Spanish record producers
Spanish DJs
1982 births
Living people
People from Barcelona